Michael Angeli (born 1970/1971) is an American writer and television producer, best known for his award-nominated work on television series including Monk and the remake of Battlestar Galactica, a show for which he was also a co-executive producer.

Angeli was co-executive producer on Black Sails, a pirate adventure drama that premiered on the Starz Network in January, 2014.

Angeli is currently in pre-production on "The Confessions of Al McGuire," a biopic with Anthony Hemingway to direct.

Early years
Angeli is a University of Wisconsin graduate with a bachelor's degree in psychology.

Career
As a screenwriter, his television credits include the TV movies Killing Mr. Griffin, Sketch Artist and Sketch Artist II, and several television series, including: Now and Again, Dark Angel, Cover Me, Medium, Monk, Touching Evil (U.S. version), In Plain Sight, Law & Order: SVU, Playmakers (ESPN's first drama), Law & Order: Criminal Intent, Battlestar Galactica and its spin-off/prequel, Caprica.

Angeli is co-author of the autobiography of World Wrestling Federation performer Chyna. Angeli ghost-wrote My Lives, the Roseanne Barr autobiography (credited on the fly page).  He profiled celebrity for such magazines as Playboy, Cosmopolitan, and Esquire.

As a free-lance writer, Angeli has covered sports and pop culture for The New York Times, Los Angeles Magazine, Details, and Sports Illustrated. An advocate of the participatory journalism elevated by the late George Plimpton, Angeli's exploits included spending 24 hours in Central Park, trying out for in-line Roller Derby, and a six-game road trip with The Los Angeles Lakers.

In July 2013, it was revealed that he has been working on a currently unannounced video game created by Santa Monica Studio.

Angeli is the co-executive producer of the 2019 CBS drama, "The Code" which debuted on April 9, 2019.

Accolades
In 2004, Angeli was nominated for an Edgar Award for Best Episode in a TV Series, for his work on "Mr. Monk and the 12th Man". In 2005 Angeli and the creative staff of the drama series, "Battlestar Galactica" won a Peabody Award. At the 60th Primetime Emmy Awards in 2008, Angeli was nominated for an Emmy Award for Outstanding Writing for a Drama Series, for his work on the Battlestar Galactica episode "Six of One".

Fellow television writer/producer Jane Espenson has called his scripts "literary objects in their own right."

Battlestar Galactica creator Ronald D. Moore:

“Michael Angeli is a fascinating guy. There was an interim period when I was at Universal before they picked up Galactica to series. I was on a deal and just waiting, and they said, “In the meantime, we want you to go help out on this show called Touching Evil,” which was a U.S. version of a U.K. show. Michael was running the writers’ room and I came over to do a script. That was the context in which I met him. He was funny, cynical, really well read. He used to be a journalist. But he has great chops in terms of writing on the page. There’s an intensity to it and a beauty to the language. He’s a writer’s writer, like Michael Taylor, who came aboard later. You read their stuff and you’re really drawn into it … sometimes to the detriment of the show, because you’re reading it and you’re like, “Wow, this is unbelievable.” Then you have to step back and go, “Wait a minute. Does this work as an hour of television?” It’s that kind of thing. But Michael is fun in a room. He’s got a vivid imagination. He’s not afraid to pitch out[…]”

Excerpt From: Edward Gross & Mark A. Altman. “So Say We All: The Complete, Uncensored, Unauthorized Oral History of Battlestar Galactica.” iBooks.

References

External links

American male screenwriters
American television writers
American male television writers

Living people

1970s births

Year of birth uncertain